A hydrophore may refer to:

 , a system used in tall buildings and marine environments to maintain water pressure; see Water supply
 Hydrophore (zoology), see Haleciidae

See also
 Hydraulic accumulator
 Hydrophobe
 Hydrophone